Social Science Quarterly is a quarterly peer-reviewed academic journal published by Wiley-Blackwell on behalf of the Southwestern Social Science Association.  The journal covers political science, sociology, economics, history, social work, geography, international studies, and women's studies.  The editors-in-chief are Keith Gaddie (University of Oklahoma), Kirby Goidel (Texas A&M University), and Kim Gaddie (University of Oklahoma)

According to the Journal Citation Reports, the journal has a 2016 impact factor of 0.849, ranking it 96th out of 165 journals in the category "Political Science" and 82nd out of 143 journals in the category "Sociology".

References

External links 
 

Wiley-Blackwell academic journals
English-language journals
Publications established in 1919
Quarterly journals
Political science journals
Sociology journals